Tarnished is a 1950 American action film directed by Harry Keller, written by John K. Butler, and starring Dorothy Patrick, Arthur Franz, Barbra Fuller, Jimmy Lydon, Harry Shannon and Don Beddoe. It was released on February 28, 1950 by Republic Pictures.

Plot

Lou Jellison is a woman living in Maine whose colleague and romantic suitor Joe Pettigrew takes her for a drive. They pick up a hitchhiker, who turns out to be Bud Dolliver, a childhood friend of Lou's who has been gone for many years, believed to be in jail.

Bud bumps into old girlfriend Nina in town. Needing a job, he follows her suggestion that he try the sardine cannery. There he finds that Lou is a secretary and Joe the personnel manager. Joe refuses to hire an ex-convict. Bud next tries boatyard owner Kelsey Bunker, who lets him work in the machine shop.
 
Kelsey's irritable son Junior causes an accident that renders Bud unconscious. A tattoo is discovered revealing Bud had been in the Marines, not in jail. When he comes to, Bud says he's unwilling to use his military service as a way of improving his reputation around town.

Lou falls for Bud, despite the strong disapproval of her parents. They elope to Vermont but are unable to wed. Upon their return, a jealous Joe picks a fight with Bud, and then Junior also punches him after catching Bud in a bar talking to Nina.

The scheming Junior tries to frame Bud for robberies in the drugstore and cannery. Bud's about to be arrested when a third business owner sets a trap and catches the real thief, Junior, in the act. Lou vouches for Bud and the town welcomes him home.

Cast    
Dorothy Patrick as Lou Jellison
Arthur Franz as Bud Dolliver
Barbra Fuller as Nina
Jimmy Lydon as Junior Bunker
Harry Shannon as Kelsey Bunker
Don Beddoe as Curtis Jellison
Byron Barr as Joe Pettigrew
Alex Gerry as Judge Oliver
Hal Price as Jed Gills
Stephen Chase as Sheriff McBride
Esther Somers as Edna Jellison
Paul E. Burns as Sam Haines
Ethel Wales as Ida Baker
Michael Vallon as Steve Barron

References

External links 
 

1950 films
American action films
1950s action films
Republic Pictures films
Films directed by Harry Keller
American black-and-white films
1950s English-language films
1950s American films